Mohamed Baker Mahmoud Younes (born 7 July 1984) is a Lebanese footballer who plays as a right-back for  club Nabi Chit.

Honours 
Ansar
 Lebanese FA Cup: 2009–10
 Lebanese Super Cup: 2011

Duhok
 Iraqi Premier League: 2009–10

Ahed
 Lebanese Elite Cup: 2011

Safa
 Lebanese Super Cup: 2013

Individual
 Lebanese Premier League Team of the Season: 2007–08

Notes

References

External links
 
 
 
 
 

1984 births
Living people
Footballers from Beirut
Lebanese footballers
Association football defenders
Racing Club Beirut players
Al Ansar FC players
Duhok SC players
Al Ahed FC players
Safa SC players
Al Nabi Chit SC players
Al Mabarra Club players
Bekaa SC players
Lebanese Premier League players
Iraqi Premier League players
Lebanon international footballers
Lebanese expatriate footballers
Lebanese expatriate sportspeople in Iraq
Expatriate footballers in Iraq